Juillac may refer to the following communes in France:

Juillac, Corrèze
Juillac, Gers
Juillac, Gironde
Juillac-le-Coq, in the department of Charente